Roger Lucey (born 1954) is a South African musician, journalist, film maker, actor and educator. In the late 1970s and early 1980s his early career as a musician was destroyed by Paul Erasmus of the Security Branch of the South African Police, because the lyrics to Lucey's protest songs were considered a threat to the Apartheid State. Although already aware of his anti-apartheid songs, the South African Government's security apparatus only swung into action to destroy Lucey's career after he performed a radical song in a programme on Voice of America radio. The criminal methods used against Lucey formed part of the testimony given by Paul Erasmus in front of the South African Truth and Reconciliation Commission.

Career
Lucey holds and Master of Arts in Liberal Studies from Duke University, North Carolina.

Musician, songwriter and composer
Lucey has recorded five albums of his own songs. He has composed music for several documentaries and plays, and has toured Namibia and South Africa playing guitar, keyboard, saxophone, flute and percussion.

Actor, playwright and writer 
Extensive work as voice artist on commercials and documentary films.
Actor on commercials, both local and international, and performer in films, drama series and plays. Worked with Nicolas Ellenbogen and Theatre for Africa. Writer of two plays for Theatre for Africa; “The High Cost of Living” directed by Andrew Brent, and “Newsroom” directed by Nicolas Ellenbogen. Both premiered at the National Arts Festival, Grahamstown. Writer of several articles on news related stories. An article on the conflict in Chechnya (published in “Playboy” magazine) was nominated for a Mondi award. Arts correspondent for Cape Etc., a lifestyle magazine based in Cape Town.
Wrote a chapter in Shoot the Singer!: Music Censorship Today.

Roger Lucey's book, Back in From the Anger, was published in 2012 by Jacana Media. It recounts his experience as a young musician in South Africa during the 1970s and 80s.

Archive
Lucey donated his archival material including photographs, vinyl records, letters and documents, to the Hidden Years Music Archive, preserved at the Documentation Centre for Music, Stellenbosch University in 2017.

Music albums
The Road is Much Longer (1979), 3rd Ear Records, 3EE 7004
Half-A-Live (1980)
Running For Cover (1990)
21 Years Down The Road (compilation) (June 2000)
Gypsy Soul (August 2002)
Now is the Time (2015)

References

External links
 
 http://www.freemuse.dk/sw9383.asp
 http://freemuse.synkron.com/sw16982.asp
 http://www.servinghistory.com/topics/Paul_Erasmus
 http://wildeblue.blogspot.com/2009/06/no-more-silencing-roger-lucey.html
 http://www.iaspm.net/review/korpe.htm
 A Review of the film Stopping the music: Music censorship in South Africa South Africa 2002, 54 minutes, Directed by Douglas Mitchell, Produced by Michael Drewett. Accessed 25 June 2008
 https://aoinstitute.ac.za/hidden-years/

 Noam Ben-Zeev, Power to Forgive. Haaretz Daily Newspaper, January 4, 2007 https://www.haaretz.com/israel-news/culture/2007-01-04/ty-article/power-to-forgive/0000017f-f526-d5bd-a17f-f73eff1f0000

1954 births
Living people
South African musicians